Cure Violence is a violence interruption program for anti-violence. It aims to stop the spread of violence in communities by using the methods and strategies associated with public health and disease control: detecting and interrupting conflicts, identifying and treating the highest risk individuals, and changing social norms.

History 
Originally developed under the name "CeaseFire" in 2000, U.S. epidemiologist Gary Slutkin launched the model in West Garfield, the most violent community in Chicago at the time. During CeaseFire's first year, shootings dropped by 67 percent.

A three-year evaluation of the Chicago implementation by the U.S. Department of Justice in 2009 found shootings and killings were reduced by 41 percent to 73 percent, shooting hot spots were reduced in size and intensity, and retaliatory murders were eliminated. "A striking finding was how important CeaseFire loomed in their lives", the researchers stated in the report. "Clients noted the importance of being able to reach their outreach worker at critical moments—when they were tempted to resume taking drugs, were involved in illegal activities, or when they felt that violence was imminent." The lead evaluator commented that, "I found the statistical results to be as strong as you could hope for."

In response to the Chicago results, federal funding for the approach was made available in 2008 and new programs were started in Baltimore and New York City, which were also evaluated and found to be effective. The US State Department also funded a pilot program in Basr and Sadr City, Iraq, which was operational from 2008 to 2013 and conducted nearly 1,000 conflict mediations.

CeaseFire was reorganized and changed its name to Cure Violence in September 2012.  Cure Violence now refers to the larger organization and overall health approach, while local program partner sites often operate under other names.  In December, 2015, Cure Violence has 23 cities implementing the Cure Violence health approach in over 50 sites in the U.S.  International program partner sites are operating in Trinidad, Honduras, Mexico, South Africa, Canada and Colombia.

Model 
Cure Violence, as the name implies, draws an analogy between the way diseases are transmitted between individuals and the way that violence spreads through communities. Their work can be compared to the work that antibiotics or vaccinations do in preventing a disease from damaging its host and spreading to others. As Gary Slutkin (the founder of Cure Violence) told the Chicago Tribune, "Violence follows usual epidemiological patterns, when you look at charts, graphs and maps, it follows exactly like all epidemics. You can think of an epidemic of a flu or tuberculosis, where there are very few cases, then there are more and more. Violence has a contagious nature. The requirement for intervention becomes obvious, you have to interact with the people who have been 'infected.'"

Cure Violence identifies metaphorically infected individuals by assessing whether they meet certain conditions, such as being a prominent member of a gang or being a recent victim of violence. Finally, the organization as a whole uses  to build a strong culture of anti-violence.

Violence Interruption 
Violence interruption is an immediate response to imminent violence; people who perform this work are referred to as interrupters. They work with their clients to find peaceful alternatives to potentially violent situations. The way they approach this is personalized to the client and the situation. For example, if they are facing cyclical gang violence then the worker might talk to their client about the perpetual harm this causes and attempt to broker peace through talks. Alternatively, if the violence is gendered, they might approach the likely instigator and reinforce an image of masculinity which is respectful and restrained.

In either case, Cure Violence emphasizes that the interrupter should be seen as a credible messenger by the client. In the case of cyclical gang violence, they employ workers with a history of violence, with an emphasis on former gang members, so that they can genuinely relate to the clients they work with. In the case of gendered violence, they employ people who are perceived as highly masculine so that their alternative description of masculinity is seen as credible. In either case, they avoid acting as informants or agents of law enforcement, as they claim that this would undermine the goal of being a credible messenger. They also try to employ interrupters who live in the area that they work in order to facilitate organic information gathering and obtain a natural path for approaching potential clients.

Workers will also sometimes reach out to potential victims in order to give them advice on how to stay safe and connect them with third-party resources that specialize in helping victims.

Some people are critical of the violence interruption approach. Dr. Malte Riemann cautioned that the model displays a neoliberal logic that runs the risk of 'replacing political solutions with medical diagnosis and treatment models'. This has depoliticizing effects as 'violence becomes disentangled from socio-economic inequalities and explained by reference to individual pathology alone'. The possible limitations of the model's extension to conflict resolution have also been discussed, especially the 'risk of undermining the establishment of positive peace in a post-conflict environment'.

Some people, particularly law enforcement officials, criticize the credible messenger aspect because it means that the people employed by Cure Violence are frequently convicted offenders. Preceding a collaborative agreement between Cure Violence and the Chicago Police Department, then-superintendent Garry McCarthy told WBEZ that he disliked their methods because Cure Violence workers "tell people, ‘Well, don’t talk to the police. We understand you can’t trust the police, but look at us, you can trust us’ - they’re undercutting that legitimacy that we’re trying to create in the community”.

Outreach Work 
Outreach workers (who are often the same people as interrupters) help clients find jobs, educational opportunities, or social services. When working with gang members who typically restrict themselves to a certain territory, outreach workers will invite them to events outside of their territory in order to expand their horizons. Workers also help clients avoid parole violations; additionally, workers advocate for leniency in sentencing if the client has been actively engaged with the outreach worker.

Community Building 
Cure Violence organizes community activities and distributes educational material, which they claim builds a culture of non-violence. They sometimes organize public vigils after prominent shootings. When relevant, they might invite the people they are working with to the vigils under the belief that witnessing the effects of shootings will make them less likely to commit violence in the future. Additionally, when the clients are people who are connected to a recent victim, workers believe that attending a respectful funeral can give their clients a healthy outlet for their grief, distracting them from thoughts of revenge.

Funding
Funding for Cure Violence and their implementing sites programs typically comes from government sources, private foundations, and charitable donations. For the first 7 years of operation in Illinois, when they were still called CeaseFire, their work was primarily supported through money from local, state, and federal grants as well as contributions from private foundations.  However, at the end of 2007, the state stopped providing direct funding to CeaseFire. This led to the program shutting down completely in some cities, such as Decatur. However, other cities were able to sustain their programs; for instance, Cicero allocated $400,000 of grant money to CeaseFire. CeaseFire also benefited from community fundraising. For instance, basketball star Dwyane Wade included CeaseFire in the list of organizations to benefit from his "Young, Fly, and Flashy" fundraising events. State funding was restored in 2009 after the governor, who previously vetoed funding, was removed from office due to an unrelated scandal. Chicago murder rates fell in 2009, which the Chicago Tribune attributed both to CeaseFire's expanded activities and evolving police strategies. However, state funding halted again in 2015.

Cure Violence has received funding from the Robert Wood Johnson Foundation, the MacArthur Foundation, and the United States Department of Justice.

Evaluation

Evidence 
In May 2008, Professor Wesley G. Skogan, an expert on crime and policing at Northwestern University, completed a three-year, independent, Department of Justice-funded report on CeaseFire, which found that the program successfully reduced shootings and killings by 41% to 73%. Shootings were reduced by up to 28% in four of the seven communities examined in the report.

In an independent evaluation of the Cure Violence model at the Baltimore partner program site commissioned by the Centers for Disease Control and conducted by Johns Hopkins University, Baltimore's Safe Streets program, the Cure Violence partner site, is credited with reducing shootings and killings by up to 34–56%.  Community norm changes occurred, even with non-clients and reductions spread to surrounding communities.

The US Department of Justice Bureau of Justice Assistance contracted with the Center for Court Innovation to evaluate the Cure Violence New York City program partner site and found the gun violence rate in the program site to be 20% lower than what it would have been had its change mirrored the average change in comparison precincts.

John Jay College was contracted by several funders to conduct an  extensive, independent evaluation on the Cure Violence approach in New York City, which found a reduction in violence, a shift in norms, and an improvement in police-community relations. The evaluation found a 37% to 50% reduction in gun injuries in the two communities examined.  Additionally, the study found a 14% reduction in attitudes supporting violence (with no change in controls) and an increased confidence in police and increased willingness to contact police. A 2015 report found that the average homicide rate in NYC program neighborhoods fell by 18% while increasing an average 69% in comparison neighborhoods.

An evaluation of the program in Port of Spain, Trinidad conducted by Arizona State University and funded by the InterAmerican Development Bank found a 45% reduction in violent crime in the service area.

Notable endorsements 
The Chicago Tribune has published multiple editorials expressing support for the program.

In 2005, then-First Lady Laura Bush visited CeaseFire headquarters in Chicago and praised their achievements.

Daniel Webster, co-director of the Johns Hopkins Center for Gun Policy and Research, advocates for CeaseFire's approach to violent crime, believing the benefits of intercession are many. On CNN.com, Webster said, "Violence is reciprocal. Stopping one homicide through mediation could buy you peace for months down the road."

In 2021, Cure Violence was listed as the 9th top NGO by NGO Advisor (now thedotgood) in its "Top 20 NGO's World" list.

In 2021, the National Gang Center graded Cure Violence model as promising.

Partners

National Sites 
Baltimore Safe Streets in Baltimore, Maryland
Aim 4 Peace in Kansas City, Missouri
Cure for Camden, Camden, New Jersey
CeaseFire Illinois, Chicago
CeaseFire New Orleans, Louisiana
Operation SNUG in New York City
Brooklyn/Crown Heights, New York City
Operation SNUG in New York
Cure Violence/NYC Mission Society, Harlem, New York City
Stand Against Violence, East Harlem, New York City
49 Strong Saving Lives, Staten island
Save our Streets, Bronx, New York City
Cure Violence, South Jamaica, New York City
CYO, Inc. in Oakland, California
Cure Violence Philadelphia
Philadelphia CeaseFire
City of San Antonio- Stand Up SA
Cease Violence, Wilmington, Delaware

International Sites 
The Chaos Theory (The Safety Box) in London, UK
CeaseFire Hanover Park (2 sites), in Hanover Park, Cape Town, South Africa
The Citizen Security Program in Trinidad & Tobago
Taller de Salud, Inc., Loiza Puerto Rico
Cristo de la Roca in San Pedro Sula, Honduras
Cure Violence plus PeaceTXT messaging to reduce election violence, Sisi Ni Amani-Kenya
American Islamic Congress, 3 sites in Basrah and 2 sites in Sadr City-Baghdad, Iraq
Ciudad Juarez, Mexico
Barrio Positivo, Honduras
CeaseFire Halifax, Canada

In the media 
The Interrupters, a documentary featuring Cure Violence (then CeaseFire) workers in Chicago.
A Path Appears: Transforming Lives, Creating Opportunity; Nicholas D. Kristof and Sheryl WuDunn
Violence as a Public Health Problem:  A Most Violent Year by Dr. Lloyd Sederer, Huffington Post, 12/9/2014
Out of the Mountains: The Coming Age of the Urban Guerrilla; David Kilcullen
Beyond Suppression: Global Perspectives on Youth Violence; Joan Serra Hoffman, Lyndee Knox, and Robert Cohen
Epidemiological Criminology: Theory to Practice; edited by Eve Waltermaurer, Timothy A. Akers
"Contagion of Violence" – 2012 Institute of Medicine report
"Cure Violence: A Disease Control Approach to Reduce Violence and Change Behavior" – by Charles Ransford, Candice Kane, and Gary Slutkin

Notes

References 

Organizations established in 2000
University of Illinois Chicago
Law enforcement non-governmental organizations in the United States
Violence interruption